Planica is a dispersed settlement in the Pohorje Hills in the Municipality of Rače–Fram in northeastern Slovenia. The area is part of the traditional region of Styria. The municipality is now included in the Drava Statistical Region.

The local church, built on an isolated spot south of the settlement, is dedicated to the Holy Cross and belongs to the Parish of Fram. It was built in 1816 on the site of a 17th-century chapel dedicated to the Holy Spirit.

References

External links
Planica at Geopedia

Populated places in the Municipality of Rače-Fram